Royal Châtelet-Farciennes Sporting Club was a Belgian football team from Châtelet, Hainaut, Belgium, last playing in the 2018–19 Belgian First Amateur Division before merging with R.O.C. de Charleroi-Marchienne to become R. Olympic Charleroi Châtelet Farciennes.

History 
The club was founded in 1926. It was promoted to the Belgian First Amateur Division, the third tier of Belgian football, for the first time in its history in 2017–18.

The club ceases to exist since 2019, following the merger with R.O.C. de Charleroi-Marchienne.

Honours 
 Belgian Second Amateur Division (1): 2016–17
 Coupe du Hainaut (2): 1937, 2001

References

External links 
 

Defunct football clubs in Belgium
Association football clubs established in 1926
Association football clubs disestablished in 2019
1926 establishments in Belgium
2019 disestablishments in Belgium
Organisations based in Belgium with royal patronage